The Budweiser Stage, originally known as the Molson Amphitheatre, is a concert venue in Toronto, Ontario, Canada. It is located on the grounds of Ontario Place and hosts many diverse acts, including genres like rock, pop, country, and jazz. The first musician to perform here was Bryan Adams on May 18, 1995.

History

Forum
Ontario Place opened in May 1971 with the original Forum as one of the first attractions. The original structure consisted of a vinyl canopy, which was replaced by a copper canopy roof in 1978. Its unique configuration consisted of a round stage, which was upgraded in 1976 to include a revolving stage which slowly rotated before the audience, which completely surrounded it. The venue had a capacity of approximately 16,000 -20,000 concertgoers who crowded the four grassy hills and the lucky few who sat on the 2,500 bench seats under a covered roof.

Amphitheatre 
Over the winter of 1994–1995, came the controversial demolition of the popular Forum and the construction of a larger venue on the site. The new venue cost . In May 1995, the new amphitheatre (under the name of Molson Amphitheatre) opened with two Bryan Adams concerts before sold-out audiences. The new Molson Amphitheatre garnered positive reviews in 1995, winning RPM Magazines "Best New Concert Venue" award.

Van Halen performed two nights in a row at the Molson in August 1995; the shows were recorded for a Pay-Per-View and an unreleased live album.

In 1997, Rush performed two nights in a row at the venue on the Test For Echo Tour. The first night was filmed for what would have been the band's first concert video released on the then-new DVD format, but it was scrapped. In a 2006 interview, lead singer and bassist Geddy Lee revealed that the DVD had to be scrapped due to issues syncing up the audio with the video, saying it would have cost the band over $150,000 and many man-hours to sync up a new recording with the footage. Although the full concert has never been officially released, much of the footage was eventually included in the Rush R40 box set released in 2014.

As of 2004, three million patrons have visited the venue. The amphitheatre hosted Canadian rapper Drake's annual OVO Festival from its inception in 2010-2015, 2017 and 2019, and 2022, when it was presented as October World Weekend. The Festival has featured performances by Drake, Eminem, Lil Wayne, Jay-Z, Kanye West, The Weeknd, and A$AP Rocky among others.

Depeche Mode performed at the amphitheatre three times: the first one was on June 16, 2001, during their Exciter Tour. The second one was on July 24, 2009, during their Tour of the Universe, in front of a sell-out crowd of 16,128 people. The third one was on September 1, 2013, during their Delta Machine Tour, in front of a sell-out crowd of 16,110 people. The 2009 show was recorded for the group's live albums project Recording the Universe.

On January 6, 2017, it was announced that the Molson Amphitheatre was renamed "Budweiser Stage", as part of a partnership between Labatt Breweries of Canada and Live Nation.

Specifications
The music venue is open yearly from May to October, due to its outdoor configuration. The amphitheatre has a capacity of approximately 16,000.  There are 5,500 reserved seats under the 60-foot-high covered roof, 3,500 seats under the open sky, and 7,000 seats on the grass bowl. The floor area (100 level) has an unreserved capacity of 1,000. There are also Club and VIP seats for season ticket-holders. Two large video screens flank the stage; the video support system gives everyone in the audience a closeup of the performers on stage.

Echo Beach
In 2011, a new open-air concert venue named Echo Beach''' was opened just east of the amphitheatre. This general admission venue has a capacity of approximately 5,000, which includes raised VIP viewing platforms.

Ontario Place revitalization plans
In 2012, the park at Ontario place remained closed with the intention of revitalization. A committee headed by John Tory has recommended the return of the Ontario Place Forum as a centerpiece of the revitalization plans. The Amphitheatre's future, as a result, has been called into question.

Budweiser Stage at Home
In 2020, during the COVID-19 pandemic in Canada, the television series Budweiser Stage at Home'' was created by Citytv and Live Nation Entertainment to provide television broadcasts of concert performances by artists who had been scheduled to play the Budweiser Stage in 2020 before the shutdowns.

See also

Exhibition Place
List of contemporary amphitheatres

Other performing arts venues in the city include:

 Four Seasons Centre
 Massey Hall
 Meridian Arts Centre
 Meridian Hall
 Roy Thomson Hall

References

External links

Budweiser Stage – upcoming shows
Echo Beach – upcoming shows

Music venues in Toronto
Amphitheatres in Canada
1995 establishments in Ontario
Music venues completed in 1995
Festival venues in Canada